Kawthaung Township (meaning Second Island or Twice Island) is a township of Kawthaung District in the Taninthayi Division of Myanmar. The principal town is Kawthaung. The township covers an area of 2,527 km2, and had a population of 140,020 at the 2014 Census.

History
At 1859, a local Chinese and Thais group is settled at Maliwan, a village 24 miles north of Kawthaung (then Victoria Point). Maliwan is noted for its numerous lakes and flower trees called Maliwan in Thai Language. And at 1865, an Arab-Malay group led by Nayuda Ahmed, traveling and collecting sea products around Mergui Archipelago start to form a base and village at bay of Victoria Point.

In 1872 the third mayor of Mergui District, Sir Ashly Din (1870–1875) assigned the first police officer to be stationed at Maliwan. In 1891, the local government offices were moved from Maliwan to Kawthaung because Maliwan is located on the bank of a small shallow river, Maliwan Creek, unsuitable for large ships to enter and waiting tide water.

References

Townships of Taninthayi Region